The Tunisia national rugby union team is a third tier rugby union nation. They first started competing in 1979 and they competed in the African qualification for the 2007 Rugby World Cup.

Tunisia also competes annually in the Africa Cup.

History

Tunisia played their first match on July 1 of 1979 where they faced the Netherlands, losing 12 points to nil. Subsequent matches were played against Yugoslavia, Spain and West Germany.

Tunisia continued to play these sides throughout the early 1980s. Their first win came in 1982, when they beat Portugal, defeating them, 16 points to 13. A period from 1982 through to 1983 saw the team undefeated for a number of games. Tunisia went on to find fair success during the middle of the decade, winning a host of games. Tunisia played some of the stronger rugby union nations towards the end of the decade, for example, Italy, Romania and the United States, though Tunisia lost these matches, they performed well in many.

Tunisia went on to find moderate success throughout the late 1980s and early 1990s. They saw similar results through the latter stages of the 1990s, winning a fair amount of their games, they competed mainly against  Zimbabwe and the Netherlands among others.

Tunisia participated in round 2 of the 2007 Rugby World Cup Africa qualification.

Tunisia participated for qualification for the 2011 Rugby World Cup again via Africa qualification coming second to Namibia losing 22-10. Therefore, eligible for qualifying via the inter-continental route, Tunisia lost on the first hurdle to Romania 56-13

Overall Record

World Cup Record

Africa Cup Record

Current squad
Players called up to Tunisia 2021 Africa Cup preparation squad.

Head Coach: 
Assistant Coach: 
Assistant Coach: 
Assistant Coach:

External links
Tunisia at Rugbydata.com

 
African national rugby union teams
Rugby union in Tunisia